Prescott is a city in central Walla Walla County, Washington. The population was 318 at the 2010 census.

History
A post office called Prescott has been in operation since 1881. The city was named after C.H. Prescott, a railroad official.

Prescott was officially incorporated on March 13, 1903.

Geography
Prescott is located at  (46.298872, -118.314408).

Climate
According to the Köppen Climate Classification system, Prescott has a semi-arid climate, abbreviated "BSk" on climate maps.

Demographics

2010 census
At the 2010 census there were 318 people in 136 households, including 84 families, in the city. The racial makeup of the city was 89.9% White, 0.6% African American, 0.9% Native American, 6.0% from other races, and 2.5% from two or more races. Hispanic or Latino of any race were 9.4%.

Of the 136 households 30.1% had children under the age of 18 living with them, 44.9% were married couples living together, 10.3% had a female householder with no husband present, 6.6% had a male householder with no wife present, and 38.2% were non-families. 28.7% of households were one person and 9.6% were one person aged 65 or older. The average household size was 2.34 and the average family size was 2.90.

The median age was 44.8 years. 23.3% of residents were under the age of 18; 8.5% were between the ages of 18 and 24; 18.6% were from 25 to 44; 35.5% were from 45 to 64; and 14.2% were 65 or older. The gender makeup of the city was 50.3% male and 49.7% female.

2000 census
At the 2000 census, there were 314 people in 123 households, including 87 families, in the city. The population density was 919.9 people per square mile (356.6/km). There were 152 housing units at an average density of 445.3 per square mile (172.6/km). The racial makeup of the city was 94.59% White, 0.32% African American, 0.96% Native American, 1.59% from other races, and 2.55% from two or more races. Hispanic or Latino of any race were 4.14% of the population.

Of the 123 households 36.6% had children under the age of 18 living with them, 54.5% were married couples living together, 11.4% had a female householder with no husband present, and 28.5% were non-families. 22.8% of households were one person and 5.7% were one person aged 65 or older. The average household size was 2.55 and the average family size was 3.01.

In the city, the age distribution of the population shows 27.4% under the age of 18, 5.4% from 18 to 24, 32.2% from 25 to 44, 22.6% from 45 to 64, and 12.4% 65 or older. The median age was 38 years. For every 100 females, there were 127.5 males. For every 100 females age 18 and over, there were 107.3 males.

The median household income was $39,500 and the median family income  was $47,708. Males had a median income of $34,750 versus $23,250 for females. The per capita income for the city was $16,931. About 13.8% of families and 18.4% of the population were below the poverty line, including 24.4% of those under age 18 and 10.3% of those age 65 or over.

References

Cities in Walla Walla County, Washington
Cities in Washington (state)
1903 establishments in Washington (state)